Louis Frank Rothschild (September 4, 1869 - June 15, 1957) was an American investment banker and founder of the eponymous investment banking firm L.F. Rothschild.

Biography 
Rothschild was born on September 4, 1869, to Frank and Amanda (Blum) Rothschild in New York City and he was not related to the Rothschild family of Europe. His brother was Simon F. Rothschild.

He was educated in public schools and received a B.S. from the City College of New York in 1889, a Ph.B. from Columbia University's School of Political Science (later became the Graduate School of Arts and Sciences) in 1890, and graduated from Columbia Law School in 1891. He practiced law from 1891 to 1893 and was engaged in manufacturing from 1893 to 1902.

He was a member of the New York Stock Exchange and founded L.F. Rothschild in 1899 with partner Leonard A. Hochstadter, formerly of the firm, Albert Loeb & Co. and their practice took up offices at 32 Broadway in New York City His firm concentrated on arbitrage.

Philanthropy 
He was involved in philanthropy and served as the treasurer of the Hospital for Joint Diseases (today part of NYU Langone Medical Center) for forty years.

Personal life 
Rothschild was married to Cora Guggenheim (1873-1956) on January 3, 1899, daughter of Meyer Guggenheim, patriarch of the Guggenheim family, and the two had three children: Louis F. Rothschild, Jr. (1900-1902), Muriel Barbara Scott (1903-1999), and Gwendolyn Fay Rothschild (1906-1983).  He died on June 15, 1957, and was survived by his two daughters, a brother, and three grandchildren.

References 

American bankers
Jewish American philanthropists
People from New York City
City College of New York alumni
Columbia University alumni
Columbia Law School alumni
1869 births
1957 deaths
Guggenheim family
American company founders